Stan Puskas (born 16 February 1946) is a Czech former footballer who played as a goalkeeper.

Career  
Puskas played in the National Soccer League with London German Canadians. In 1971, he played in the North American Soccer League with Montreal Olympique. He made his debut for Montreal on 19 April 1971 against Atlanta Chiefs. After a season in the NASL he returned to former team London German Canadians, and managed to score a goal against the Serbian White Eagles FC. In 1973, he signed with league rivals London City. 

He re-signed with London for the 1974 season, and for the 1975 season. In 1976, he played with the Windsor Stars.

Personal life 
Puskas was the nephew to Ferenc Puskás.

References  
 

Living people
1946 births
Association football goalkeepers
Czech footballers
Montreal Olympique players
London City players
Canadian National Soccer League players
North American Soccer League (1968–1984) players